Charles Kelsall (15 April 1921 – 20 April 2019) was a Welsh professional footballer who played as a left-back. He made appearances in the English Football League for Wrexham, and also played for Welsh teams Buckley and Holywell Town. Kelsall died on 20 April 2019 at the age of 98.

References

1921 births
2019 deaths
Association football defenders
English Football League players
Holywell Town F.C. players
Welsh footballers
Wrexham A.F.C. players
People from Hawarden
Sportspeople from Flintshire